Marzio is a comune (municipality) in the Province of Varese in the Italian region Lombardy, located about  northwest of Milan and about  north of Varese. The origin of the name "Marzio" could derive from the Latin name "Marcius" or it could refer to the Italian word "rotten". The council of Marzio covers an area of 1.98 kilometers2 
Marzio borders the following municipalities: Brusimpiano, Cadegliano-Viconago, Cuasso al Monte, Lavena Ponte Tresa, Marchirolo; the territory of the Comune is comprised in the Cinque Vette Park.

Demographic evolution

References

Cities and towns in Lombardy